Valentin Rongier (born 7 December 1994) is a French professional footballer who plays as a midfielder for Ligue 1 club Marseille.

Club career

Nantes
Born in Mâcon, Rongier joined Nantes' youth academy in 2001. He made his Ligue 1 debut for the club on 18 October 2014 against Stade de Reims in a 1–1 draw, coming off the bench to replace Lucas Déaux in the 78th minute mark. He was appointed club captain ahead of the 2018–19 season.

Marseille
On 3 September 2019, Rongier joined Olympique de Marseille on a five-year contract for a €13 million transfer fee.

Career statistics

References

External links
 

1994 births
Living people
Association football midfielders
French footballers
FC Nantes players
Olympique de Marseille players
Ligue 1 players
Championnat National 2 players
Championnat National 3 players
Sportspeople from Mâcon
Footballers from Bourgogne-Franche-Comté